South China is a village in the town of China in Kennebec County, Maine, United States.  It is one of five villages in the town. Located between Augusta and Waterville, South China sits along the shores of its namesake, China Lake. It is both an hour and a half from Bangor and Portland. Maine State Route 3 runs through the major part of the town, leading west to Augusta and east to Belfast, and U.S. Route 202 (Lakeview Drive) connects South China with China.

Communities
South China is home to Friends Camp, a Quaker summer camp which has been active for over 50 years. It is also the home of a Christian church, South China Community Church, across from the South China Library (founded in 1830).  The church is open to and welcomes all practicing Christians of any denomination.  Three-Mile Pond can be accessed from Route 3, a mile south of the South China Community Church. South China is also home to Maine's second largest private high school, Erskine Academy.

Business
Ron Reed Antiques is on Mayflower Drive.  At the intersection of Washington Boulevard and Mayflower Drive is the Pond and three camps to the right is Grammy's Camp at 12 West Washington Boulevard. In 2008, a new restaurant was established along Lakeview Drive known as the "China Dine-ah," which serves country cooking-style meals. MJEK's grill opened in the summer of 2012 right beside the China Dine-ah and specializes in seafood. An ice cream shop, Back's Dairy Bar, is open during the spring and summer. In 2008, a new Hannaford's was constructed right off of Route 3. A Family Dollar store was also recently built. Norm's restaurant, adjacent to the Family Dollar on Route 3, opened in 2013 but has since closed. Most recent is the upgrade of a convenience store also on Route 3. It has both a Subway and a Dunkin' Donuts franchise in it.

Entertainment
For the people who live or go here during vacation, swimming in China Lake is a popular pastime. There is a small beach area by the China Community Church on Lakeview Drive. In the winter of 2013, G.O. Tubing opened up on Alder Park Road. South China is only a fifteen minute's drive from places such as Augusta and Lake St. George.

Notable residents
 Rufus Jones (1863-1948), writer, magazine editor, philosopher, Quaker theologian, historian, and college professor; the only person to have delivered two Swarthmore Lectures
 Mary Mayhew, 2018 Republican candidate for governor who currently resides in South China
 Stacy Westfall, horsewoman and inductee in National Cowgirl Hall of Fame, was raised in South China.

China, Maine
Villages in Kennebec County, Maine